Tourism is an important sector for Philippine economy. The travel and tourism industry contributed 5.2%% to the country's GDP in 2021; this was lower than the 12.7% recorded in 2019 prior to the COVID-19 lockdowns. The country is known for having its rich biodiversity as its main tourist attraction. Popular destinations among tourists include Boracay, Palawan, and Siargao. Despite potential, the Philippines has lagged in tourism industry behind some of its Southeast Asian neighbors due to political and social problems.

As of 2019, 5.7 million Filipinos have been employed in the tourism sector. In 2015, the Philippine government collected P227.62 billion pesos ( equal to 4.15 billion US$ ) from foreign tourists, almost 25% of which came from Boracay. The country attracted a total of 5,360,682 foreign visitors in 2015 through its successful tourism campaign of "It's More Fun in the Philippines". In 2019, foreign arrivals peaked at 8,260,913.

The country is also home to one of the New7Wonders of Nature, the Puerto Princesa Subterranean River National Park, and one of the New7Wonders Cities, the Heritage City of Vigan. It is also home to six UNESCO World Heritage Sites scattered in nine different locations, three UNESCO biosphere reserves, three UNESCO intangible cultural heritage, four UNESCO memory of the world documentary heritage, one UNESCO creative city, two UNESCO World Heritage cities, seven Ramsar wetland sites, and eight ASEAN Heritage Parks.

Overview

In 2011, the Department of Tourism (DOT) recorded 3.9 million tourists visiting the country, 11.2 percent higher than the 3.5 million registered in 2010. Tourist arrivals jumped to 4.27 million in 2012, after the DOT launched a widely publicized tourism marketing campaign entitled "It's More Fun In the Philippines".

The 2017 Travel and Tourism Competitiveness Report of the World Economic Forum ranked the Philippines 79th out of 136 countries overall. The country's best-rated features were price competitiveness (22nd) and natural resources (37th).

The tourism industry employed 3.8 million Filipinos, or 10.2 per cent of national employment, in 2011, according to data gathered by the National Statistical Coordination Board.

The official heritage properties of the Philippines are listed under the National Government's Philippine Registry of Cultural Property (PRECUP), Pinagmulan: Enumeration from the Philippine Inventory of Intangible Cultural Heritage, and the National Integrated Protected Areas System (NIPAS). Properties registered among those lists are heralded as possible nominations to the UNESCO World Heritage List, where at least 16 declarations containing 19 properties have been recognized by UNESCO through its 4 different lists (UNESCO World Heritage List, UNESCO Memory of the World Register, UNESCO Intangible Cultural Heritage List, and UNESCO Biosphere Reserve Registry).

History

Tourism in the Philippines traces its origins during the ancient times when the first set of people chose to migrate through land bridges, followed by the other sets of migrations from the Malayan archipelago in the south and Taiwan in the north. Trade also became part of the tourism as Arabs, Indians, Japanese, Chinese, Malays, and other ethnic groups in mainland Southeast Asia, Taiwan, and Ryukyu traded goods with the natives. When the islands became part of the territory of Spain, an influx of Spanish people migrated into the country, though still few compared to the Spanish migrations in South America as the Philippines was farther from Spain.

The tourism industry first truly flourished during the late 19th to early 20th century due to the influx of immigrants from Europe and the United States. It was listed as one of the best countries to visit in Asia aside from Hong Kong and Japan, earning the nickname "Pearl of the Orient Seas". The tourism declined during and after the World War II, leaving the country with a completely devastated economy, and a landscape filled with destroyed heritage towns. The second wave of tourist influx flourished in the 1950s but declined drastically during the dictatorship era. After the People Power Revolution, the tourism industry continued to decline due to the domino effect caused by the Marcos dictatorship. The industry only managed to cope in 1991 and 1992, where 1.2 million tourists visited the Philippines. It afterwards waned again after a decade due to corrupt practices in government.

The tourism industry flourished again at the early part of the 2010s under the "It's More Fun in the Philippines" slogan, which was regarded as an international success. The country saw an influx of foreign tourists, with the aid of social media and the creative tagline. Tourism reached its peak in 2015 with 5,360,682 foreign tourists arrivals recorded. The industry continued to grow in 2017, but the growth rate from Western tourists drastically decreased due to the drug war and the declaration of martial law in Mindanao. Nonetheless, the growth continued due to an influx of Asian and Russian tourists.

8,260,913 international visitors arrived from January to December 2019, up by 15.24% for the same period in 2018.  of these came from East Asia,  came from North America, and  came from other ASEAN countries.

The tourism industry was severely affected during the COVID-19 pandemic, when tourist arrivals dropped to only 1.48 million in 2020 due to government pandemic-related lockdowns to control the spread of the virus, and when Super Typhoon Odette ravaged tourism-dependent remote islands, including Siargao, in central and southern Philippines in December 2021. The country was reopened to international tourists starting February 10, 2022, after nearly two years of border closure due to the COVID-19 pandemic.

Government initiatives since 2018
Under the National Tourism Development Plan (NDTP), the Duterte administration set aside $23 billion to develop tourist infrastructure that was "not only sustainable and highly competitive in the region, but also socially responsible to propel inclusive growth". In 2018, the Department of Tourism recorded 7.1 million foreign tourists to the Philippines that year, despite the closure of popular destination Boracay for cleanup. A total of 8.26 million international tourists visited the country throughout 2019, breaking the department's record and exceeding the NDTP target.

Following a decline in tourism due to a COVID-19 border closure of two years, the administration reopened the Philippines to international tourists and stopped requiring RT-PCR tests of fully-vaccinated passengers upon arrival.

Statistics

Country visitor statistics

Annual statistics (foreign arrivals)

Regional statistics (2019)

Attractions

The island of Luzon is considered the political and economic center of the Philippines. The economy of Luzon is centered in Metro Manila, the national capital region. Manila was ranked 11th most attractive city for American shoppers out of 25 Asia Pacific cities by a Global Blue survey in 2012. Shopping malls can be found around the metropolis, especially in the business and financial districts of Makati, Ortigas and Bonifacio Global City.

The most popular destinations in the Visayas are Cebu and Boracay known for their white sand beaches and has been favorite island destinations for local and foreign visitors. In 2012, Boracay received the "best island" award from the international travel magazine Travel + Leisure. Boracay is also a popular destination for relaxation, tranquility and an exciting nightlife. In 2018, three Philippine islands, Siargao Island, Boracay, and Palawan, were listed on Condé Nast Traveler's list of Asia's best islands. The three islands were ranked first, second, and third, respectively.

Mindanao, the southernmost island of the Philippines, is home to the country's highest mountain, Mount Apo. The mountain has become a popular hiking destination for mountain climbers. On average, it takes two days to reach the summit. The mountain has a wide range of flora and fauna, including over 272 bird species, 111 of which are endemic to the area, including the national bird, the Philippine eagle.

Immovable Tangible Heritage

The Philippines has six UNESCO World Heritage Sites scattered in nine different locations: Vigan, Baroque Churches of the Philippines (comprising Santa Maria Church, Paoay Church, San Agustin Church, Miagao Church), Rice Terraces of the Philippine Cordilleras which includes five different rice terrace clusters, Tubbataha Reefs Natural Park, Puerto Princesa Subterranean River National Park, and Mount Hamiguitan Wildlife Sanctuary.

There country has one UNESCO World Heritage City, Vigan, and one UNESCO Creative City, (Baguio). There are three UNESCO Biosphere Reserves (Palawan Biosphere Reserve, Albay Biosphere Reserve, and Puerto Galera Biosphere Reserve), and eight ASEAN Heritage Parks (Mount Apo National Park, Mounts Iglit–Baco National Park, Mount Kitanglad National Park, Mount Makiling National Park, Tubbataha Reefs Natural Park, Mount Hamiguitan Wildlife Sanctuary, and Timpoong and Hibok-Hibok Natural Monument).

Movable Tangible Heritage

The Philippines possesses numerous significant movable tangible heritage, both in cultural and natural terms. Many are declared as national treasures and are highly protected by the law. The country has four documentary heritage inscribed in the UNESCO Memory of the World Register, namely, the José Maceda Collection, Philippine Paleographs (Hanunoo, Buhid, Tagbanua, and Pala’wan), Presidential Papers of Manuel L. Quezon, and Radio Broadcast of the Philippine People Power Revolution. Many of the cultural objects of the country are housed in government and private museums and libraries throughout the archipelago, such as the National Museum of the Philippines and the National Library of the Philippines. Aside from movable heritage under Philippine possession, there are also Philippine-originated artifacts and art pieces that have been looted or bought by foreigners and are now housed by other countries. Such pieces include the Golden Tara, the two existing copies of Doctrina Cristiana, the Boxer Codex, and many others.

Intangible Heritage

The country currently possesses at least three UNESCO intangible cultural heritage elements, one of which, the Hudhud Epic Chants of the Ifugao, was declared by UNESCO as one of the eleven great traditions of humanity. The other two elements inscribed by UNESCO are the Darangen Chant of the Maranao people of Lake Lanao and the Punnuk tug-of-war Game of the Ifugao. Education concerning Philippine mythology is also a notable intangible heritage of the country.

Filipino cuisine

Filipino cuisine is the polymerization of 144 distinct cuisines in the Philippines, coming from separate ethno-linguistic groups. The style of cooking and the food associated with it have evolved over many centuries from their Austronesian origins (shared with Malaysian and Indonesian cuisines) to a mixed cuisine of Indian, Chinese, Spanish, and American influences, in line with the major waves of influence that had enriched the cultures of the archipelago, as well as others adapted to indigenous ingredients and the local palate. Well-known Filipino food include adobo, sinigang, kare-kare, pinakbet, lumpia, pancit, lechon, sisig, halo-halo, pandesal, puto, chicharrón, bibingka, dinengdeng, suman, and balut. Adobo and ube are the most internationally known.

Tourism activities

Beaching and diving 

Various beaches in the Philippines have landed in multiple magazine rankings. Among the most popular beach and diving choices in the country include Boracay, El Nido, Coron, Cebu, and Siargao. In 2018, Canadian-based travel agency Flight Network listed Hidden Beach in Palawan (No. 1) as the best beach in all of Asia. The beach was also cited by Travel+Leisure as among the 13 places to see the bluest water in the world. Other beaches ranked from the Philippines were Guyam White Sand Beach in Siargao (No. 13), Palaui Beach in Cagayan Valley (No. 22), Caramoan Island Beach in Camarines Sur (No. 29), Dahican Beach in Mati, Davao Oriental (No. 41), Gumasa Beach in Sarangani (No. 45), Alona Beach in Panglao, Bohol (No. 46), Kalanggaman Island in Cebu (No. 49), and Paliton Beach in Siquijor (No. 50).

Hiking 

Among the most famous hiking areas in the country are Mount Apo, Mount Pinatubo, Mount Halcon, Mount Banahaw, Mount Makiling, and Mount Pulag. Online magazine, Culture Trip, cited Mount Batulao in Batangas, Masungi Georeserve in Rizal, Tarak Ridge in Bataan, Mount Daraitan and Maynoba in Rizal, Kibungan Circuit in Benguet, and Mount Pulag in Nueva Vizcaya for having the most spectacular hiking trails in the country in 2017.

Research and education 

Due to the diverse number of flora and fauna of the country, researchers from around the world have flocked various biodiversity sites in Philippine environmental corridors. Among the big draws for environmental researchers include Mount Mantalingajan, Sibuyan Island, Dinagat Islands, Mount Hamiguitan, Central Panay Mountain Range, Verde Island Passage, Tubbataha Reef, Mount Malindang, Northern Sierra Madre Natural Park, and Turtle Islands, Tawi-Tawi. Local and foreign archaeologists and anthropologists have also flocked the country's archaeological sites, such as Cagayan Valley, Butuan, Tabon Cave, Callao Cave, Banton, Ifugao, Cebu, Lanao del Sur, and many others.

Common nationals that seek graduate degrees or reviewer sessions in the Philippines usually come from India, South Korea, and Palau. Language schools with English language programs are also popular among Asian foreigners from South Korea, Thailand, Vietnam, Myanmar, Taiwan, and Japan. Government-approved institutions that teach Philippine mythology and suyat scripts, such as baybayin, have also become popular among locals and foreigners.

Arts and crafts tourism 

Arts and crafts tourism in the Philippines has recently expanded following several attempts to establish a cultural renaissance. The country was conferred its first UNESCO Creative City through Baguio in 2016. Other arts and crafts centers are in Manila, Quezon City, San Fernando City, Iloilo City, Angono, Santiago, Cebu City, Basey, Davao City, Lake Sebu, Angeles City, Vigan, Basco, Zamboanga City, Marawi, Tugaya, Cotabato City, Sariaya, Tagbilaran, and Dumaguete.

Pilgrimage 

The Philippines is the Catholic pilgrimage capital of Asia, possessing hundreds of olden churches, most of which were established between the 15th to 19th centuries through the earthquake baroque architecture. Historic mosques, temples, and indigenous places of worship such as dambanas are also present throughout the country. Popular pilgrimage sites in the country include Paoay Church, Quiapo Church, Manaoag Church, Taal Basilica, and Naga Cathedral.

Festivals 

The country has thousands of festivals, most of which are annual spectacles. Each of the festivals, locally known as fiesta, have different traditions at play, and may be religious or secular in nature. Among the most popular include the Ati-Atihan Festival of Aklan, Sinulog Festival of Cebu, the Dinagyang Festival of Iloilo, the Panagbenga Festival of Baguio, the Moriones Festival of Marinduque, and the MassKara Festival of Bacolod.

Protection and restoration

The Philippines is home to numerous heritage towns and cities, many of which have been intentionally destroyed by the Japanese through fire tactics in World War II and the Americans through bombings during the same war. After the war, the government of the Empire of Japan withheld from giving funds to the Philippines for the restoration of the heritage towns they destroyed, effectively destroying any chances of restoration since the pre-war Philippines' economy was devastated and had limited monetary supply. On the other hand, the United States gave minimal funding for only two of the hundreds of cities they destroyed, namely, Manila and Baguio. Today, only the centres (poblacion or downtown areas) of Filipino heritage towns and cities remain in most of the expansive heritage cities and towns in the country. Yet, some heritage cities in their former glory prior to the war still exist, such as the UNESCO city of Vigan which was the only heritage town saved from American bombing and Japanese fire and kamikaze tactics. The country currently lacks a city/town-singular architectural style law. Due to this, unaesthetic cement or shanty structures have taken over heritage buildings annually, destroying many former heritage townscapes. Some heritage buildings have been demolished or sold to corporations, and have been replaced by commercial structures such as shopping centers, condominium units, or newly-furnished modern-style buildings, completely destroying the old aesthetics of many former heritage towns and cities. Only the heritage city of Vigan has a town law that guarantees its singular architecture (the Vigan colonial style) shall always be used in constructions and reconstructions. While Silay, Iloilo City, and San Fernando de Pampanga have ordinances giving certain tax exemptions to owners of heritage houses. In 2010, the Philippine Cultural Heritage Act passed into law, effectively giving protection to all cultural heritage properties of the Philippines. However, despite its passage, many ancestral home owners continue to approve the demolition of ancestral structures.

Visa policy

The visa policy of the Philippines is governed by Commonwealth Act No. 613, also known as the Philippine Immigration Act, and by subsequent legislation amending it. The Act is jointly enforced by the Department of Foreign Affairs (DFA) and the Bureau of Immigration (BI).

Generally, foreign nationals who wish to enter the Philippines require a visa unless:

 He/she is a citizen of a member state of the Association of Southeast Asian Nations (ASEAN)
 He/she is a citizen of a non-ASEAN member state whose nationals are allowed to enter the Philippines visa-free
 He/she is a balikbayan and is only returning to the Philippines temporarily

Most foreign nationals are visa-free for 14 days, 30 days, or 59 days. Of more than 200 countries and territories, 39 need visas to enter the Philippines.

Immigration and customs

Entry Guidelines on temporary visitors
Nationals from countries who are travelling to the Philippines for business and tourism purposes are allowed to enter the Philippines obtaining visa on arrival for a stay not exceeding 30 days, provided they hold valid tickets for their return journey to port of origin or next port of destination. However, immigration officers at ports of entry may exercise their discretion to admit holders of passports valid for at least sixty days beyond the intended period of stay.

Customs
Upon arriving, visitors are allowed to bring in duty-free personal belongings, two cartons of cigarettes or two tins of pipe tobacco and up to one liter of alcohol. Exceeding this is illegal. Balikbayans have separate rules and should check with the embassy or consulate in their home city.

Currency regulations
It is illegal for any incoming or outgoing passenger to bring in or out Philippine pesos in excess of P10,000.00 without prior authority from the Bangko Sentral ng Pilipinas. Any violation of this rule may lead to its seizure and civil penalties and / or criminal prosecution.

The transportation of foreign currency or monetary instruments is legal. However, the carrying of foreign currency in excess of US$10,000.00 or its equivalent in other foreign currencies must be declared to a Customs Officer or the Bangko Sentral ng Pilipinas. Violation of this rule may lead to seizure and sanctions, fines and / or penalties.

Transportation

Air transportation

Currently, there are 16 airports classified by the Civil Aviation Authority of the Philippines as International Airports. There are also hundreds of principal domestic airports and community airports throughout the country. The international airports include:

 Bacolod–Silay International Airport in Silay, Negros Occidental
 Bicol International Airport in Legazpi, Albay
 Bohol–Panglao International Airport in Panglao, Bohol
 Cagayan North International Airport in Lal-lo, Cagayan
 Clark International Airport in Mabalacat, Pampanga
 Francisco Bangoy International Airport in Davao City
 General Santos International Airport in General Santos
 Iloilo International Airport in Cabatuan, Iloilo
 Kalibo International Airport in Kalibo, Aklan
 Laguindingan International Airport in Laguindingan, Misamis Oriental
 Laoag International Airport in Laoag, Ilocos Norte
 Mactan–Cebu International Airport in Lapu-Lapu City, Cebu
 Ninoy Aquino International Airport in Pasay / Parañaque
 Puerto Princesa International Airport in Puerto Princesa
 Subic Bay International Airport in Morong, Bataan
 Zamboanga International Airport in Zamboanga City

Sea transportation

The country traditionally used sea vehicles since pre-colonial times. The archipelagic country has four areas of ports concentration, as administered by the Philippine Ports Authority. These areas are the South China Sea ports area, Philippine Sea ports area, Celebes Sea ports area, and Inland Seas ports area. Each area has hundreds of ports serving local and international ships and other sea vehicles.

International Tourism Offices

Every town and city in the Philippines has at least one tourism office. The country has also established numerous tourism offices in various foreign countries. The international tourism offices include:

 Tokyo, Japan
 Osaka, Japan
 Seoul, South Korea
 Petaling Jaya, Malaysia
 Singapore
 Taipei, Taiwan
 Bangkok, Thailand
 Ho Chi Minh, Vietnam
 Jakarta, Indonesia
 New Delhi, India
 Mumbai, India
 Beijing, China
 Shanghai, China
 Sydney, Australia
 London, United Kingdom
 Frankfurt, Germany
 Moscow, Russia
 Madrid, Spain
 Milan, Italy
 Paris, France
 Dubai, UAE
 Toronto, Canada
 New York, USA
 San Francisco, USA
 Los Angeles, USA

Embassies and consulates of the Philippines throughout the world also serve as de facto international tourism offices.

Threats

Terrorism may pose the greatest threat to tourists' safety in the Philippines, notably in the southern regions bordering Malaysia. The far-southern region is widely known as a no-go zone for foreign visitors. Areas surrounding Marawi and other parts of the island are considered unsafe due to violent activities of rebel groups which include the Maute Group and Moro Islamic Liberation Front (MILF).

Certain militant Islamist groups such as Abu Sayyaf and Jema'ah Islamiyah are particularly dangerous, since they are responsible for the majority of recent attacks, which have included bombings, piracies, kidnappings and killings of foreign nationals if their government failed to pay the demanded ransom. The New People's Army of the Communist Party of the Philippines has been listed as a rebel or terrorist group by the Philippines and the United States.

Other threats include cultural heritage destruction due to damage, demolition, or looting of heritage structures, and urbanization of younger generations away from indigenous traditions, causing various rituals and practices to fade away. Threats to natural heritage include mining, severe population growth, urbanization, introduction of invasive species, deforestation, water pollution, air pollution, climate change, irresponsible tourists, and a lack of initiative in proper waste disposal among poor brackets in society.

See also

Visa policy of the Philippines
Philippine Registry of Cultural Property
List of festivals in the Philippines
Arts of the Philippines
List of beaches in the Philippines
Architecture of the Philippines
Biosphere reserves of the Philippines
Intangible Cultural Heritage of the Philippines
Lists of Cultural Properties of the Philippines
Archaeology of the Philippines
List of national parks of the Philippines
World Heritage Sites in the Philippines

References

External links

Department of Tourism Philippines
It's More Fun in the Philippines (Official Tourism Website)

Philippines